The tennis tournament at the 2016 Summer Olympics was held at the Olympic Tennis Centre from 6 to 14 August. The competition was played on a fast hardcourt surface used in numerous North American tournaments that aims to minimize disruption for players.

Initially a total of 172 players were expected to compete in five events: singles and doubles for both men and women and the return of the mixed doubles for the second consecutive time. However, eventually 105 male and 94 female players were granted places in the draws. The Olympic tennis events were run and organized by the Brazilian Olympic Committee (COB) and the International Tennis Federation (ITF), and were part of the Association of Tennis Professionals (ATP) and Women's Tennis Association (WTA) tours.

The 2016 Olympic tournament was the fifteenth edition of tennis at the Olympics (excluding the two Olympics, 1968 and 1984, when tennis was a demonstration event), and the eighth since 1988, when the sport was officially brought back into the Games. Unlike previous editions of the Olympic event, it was decided that the Olympic tournaments would not offer ATP and WTA ranking points for the players.

Summary

Serena Williams was the defending champion in the women's singles, but she lost to Elina Svitolina in the third round. Unseeded Puerto Rican Monica Puig won the gold medal, defeating Germany's world number two Angelique Kerber in the final, 6–4, 4–6,  This marked Puerto Rico's first ever Olympic gold medal and made Puig her country's first ever female medalist.

In the men's singles, British flagbearer Andy Murray was the defending champion from the London tournament at Wimbledon, while Novak Djokovic was the number one seed and aiming to complete the Career Golden Slam. However, he was defeated in the first round by Argentina's Juan Martín del Potro. Murray defended his title, defeating del Potro in the final, 7–5, 4–6, 6–2, 7–5. With the victory, Murray became the first player, male or female, to win singles gold at two consecutive Olympics and the first player to defend an Olympic title since Serena and Venus Willams won the women's doubles title in Beijing and London. This, combined with a second Wimbledon title, becoming the first-ever three-time BBC Sports Personality of the Year and ending the year as the #1-ranked player by the ATP after having led Great Britain to their first Davis Cup since 1936 in 2015, contributed to his being knighted in the New Year's Honours List.

Serena and Venus Williams were the two-time defending champions and number one seeds in the women's doubles, but they lost in the first round to Czech pairing Lucie Šafářová and Barbora Strýcová. The defeat ended the sisters' 15 match winning streak in women's doubles at the Olympics, and also marked their first loss together in Olympic competition. Russian duo Ekaterina Makarova and Elena Vesnina won the gold medal, defeating Timea Bacsinszky and Martina Hingis in the final, 6–4, 6–4. Martina Hingis had been attempting to become just the fifth woman to complete the Career Golden Slam in doubles.

In the men's doubles, Bob and Mike Bryan were the defending champions, but they withdrew before the competition as a result of health concerns. French duo Pierre-Hugues Herbert and Nicolas Mahut were the number one seeds, but lost in the first round to Juan Sebastian Cabal and Robert Farah from Colombia. Spaniards Marc López and Rafael Nadal won the gold medal, defeating Romanian duo Florin Mergea and Horia Tecău in the final, 6–2, 3–6, 6–4.

Victoria Azarenka and Max Mirnyi were the defending champions in the mixed doubles tournament, but they were not able to defend their title as a result of Azarenka's withdrawal due to pregnancy. American pair Bethanie Mattek-Sands and Jack Sock won the gold medal, defeating their compatriots Venus Williams and Rajeev Ram in the final, 6–7(3–7), 6–1, [10–7].

Qualification

For the singles competitions, the top 56 players in the world rankings on 6 June 2016 of the WTA and ATP tours are qualified for the Olympics. However, entry has been limited to four players from a country.  This means that players who are ranked in the top 56 but represent the NOCs with four higher-ranked players already participating do not qualify, allowing players who are ranked outside of the top 56 but from countries with fewer than four players already qualified to compete. Of the remaining eight slots, six of them will be determined by the ITF's Olympic Committee, taking into account ranking and spread of nations represented, while the final two slots are awarded by the IOC to players from small nations.

In the doubles competitions, 24 teams are automatically qualified for the Games based on the rankings to be published on 6 June 2016, subject to a maximum of two teams per NOC. Players in the top ten of the doubles rankings could reserve a place, provided they had a partner to compete with. Meanwhile, the remaining eight teams were decided by the ITF Olympic Committee.

A player could only participate if he or she was available to be drafted to represent the player's country in Davis Cup or Fed Cup for two of the following years: 2013, 2014, 2015, and 2016, with one of the years being either 2015 or 2016.

Competition format
The tennis competition at the Olympic Games consisted of a single elimination tournament. The size of the singles draw, 64, meant that there were six rounds of competition in total, with five in the doubles owing to its smaller draw size of 32, and 4 for mixed with its draw size only being 16. Players reaching the semifinal were assured of an opportunity to compete for a medal, with the two losing semifinalists contesting a bronze medal match.

All matches were the best of three sets, except for the men's singles final which was the best of five sets. The tie break operated in every set, including the final one (a first for the Olympics). In the mixed doubles the third set was played as a match tie-break (10 points).

Schedule

Medal summary

Medal table

Medal events

Singles seeds

Men's singles

The following players received an ITF invitation:
 
 
 
 
 
 

The following players received a Tripartite Commission invitation:
 
 

The following players were originally in the entry list and supposed to be seeded but withdrew prior to the event:
  – Knee injury
  – Back injury
  –  Anxiety over Zika virus situation
  – Anxiety over Zika virus situation
  – Back injury

Women's singles

The following players received an ITF invitation:
 
 
 
 
 
 

The following players received a Tripartite Commission invitation:
 
 

The following players were originally in the entry list and supposed to be seeded but withdrew prior to the event:
  – Health concerns
  – Pregnancy
  – Wrist injury
  – Health concerns
  – Leg injury

Doubles seeds

Men's doubles

The following players received an ITF invitation:

Women's doubles

The following players received an ITF invitation:

Mixed doubles

See also
Wheelchair tennis at the 2016 Summer Paralympics

References

External links

 
 
 ITF Olympic Coverage 
 NBC Olympics: Tennis
 Results Book – Tennis

 
2016 Summer Olympics events
Olympics
2016 Olympics
2016
Tennis in Rio de Janeiro